Chah Ab District (Persian: ولسوالی چاه آب) is a district of Takhar Province, Afghanistan. Its district center is Chah Ab. The district's economy is primarily based on agriculture and livestock.

Geography
Chah Ab has an area of 764 kilometers, comparatively equivalent to Dominica. There are 63 villages within this district.

Location
Chah Ab is located in the northeast corner of Takhar province, and borders 3 Afghan districts and one Tajik province. They are Shahri Buzurg to the east, Rustaq to the south, Yangi Qala to the west, and Khatlon to the north. Shahri Buzurg is located in Badakhshan Province. Khatlon is a province, located in Tajikistan. The border between Chah Ab and Khatlon is the Panj river.

Demographics
87860 people live in the district as of 2015. The district has 99 males for every 100 females, and the median age is 16.2. 
40.3% of the population was employed in 2015, however 5% of those people were seeking work. The average household size is 6.5 people.

Economy
Farming and livestock are the main economic activities of the area. The main agricultural crops grown are wheat, barley, flax, chickpea and sesame. Agricultural output is low because of a lack of new farming technologies and skilled workers.

Chah Ab is rich with mines and natural resources, and one material mined is gold. However, they are largely unregulated. In addition, the forests are being cut down for light and fuel due to a lack of electricity.

Education and health
Only about a third of the population ages 15–24 could read in 2015, and under 10% in 2006. Education has poor quality, with a shortage of money, staff, supplies, and building space. Some people object to sending girls to school due to traditional sentiments.

There is only one health clinic in the district as of 2006, and it cannot serve everyone that needs health care. This causes a high mortality rate.

References

Districts of Takhar Province